Isabel Kutner de Souza (born 27 May 1970) is a Brazilian actress and theater director.

Biography 
The actress Isabel Kutner de Souza was born on May 27, 1970, daughter of actors Dina Sfat and Paulo José, and sister of actress Ana Kutner and director Clara Kutner.

Career 
The choice of profession was easy and precocious. At age 13, went to study theater and at 15 was already sure that she was going to be an actress. It began in television in the Rede Manchete, in the novel Corpo Santo (87), like Renata. He then stars in Bebê a Bordo (88) as the younger version of Laura, a character played by his mother, Dina Sfat.

Soon, in double dose, it makes the miniseries Meu Marido (91), like Aline and the novel Vamp (91), like Scarlet. Later, also in double dose, it makes the miniseries Sex Appeal (93), like Carla and the novel Olho no Olho (93), like Júlia.  In 1996, he transferred to SBT, where he made the novel Razão de Viver (96), as Rosa.

In 1997, she returns to Rede Globo in the soap opera Anjo Mau (97), as Helena Jordão Ferraz, and in 1999, she does the miniseries Chiquinha Gonzaga (99), as Maria Gonzaga do Amaral. He then makes two more novels by Antônio Calmon, An Um Anjo Caiu do Céu (2001), as Lulu and Começar de Novo (2004), as Marilyn Monteiro, besides the novel Desejos de Mulher (2002), like Carol. Afterwards, she participates in Eterna Magia (2007), as Bertha, and soon, she makes A Favorita (2008), like Amélia Gurgel, making pair with Mário Gomes (Francisco).

In 2010, Bel participated in the novel Escrito nas Estrelas, as Dr. Virgínia, and in 2011, participated in the remake of O Astro, as secretary Sílvia, who has an affair with a married man, Amin Hayalla (Tato Gabus Mendes). In 2012, Bel played the submissive Marialva in the remake of the novel Gabriela. In 2013, she was cast for the cast of the soap opera Amor à Vida, playing nurse Joana Rangel, who suffered from dating Luciano (Lucas Romano) who was younger than herself.

In 2015, Bel interpreted teacher Darlene in Verdades Secretas. In 2018, after a brief visit to RecordTV where she participated in the third season of the Conselho Tutelar series, Bel returns to the soap operas of Rede Globo on O Outro Lado do Paraíso.

Personal life 
In 1989 she began dating actor Eduardo Moscovis, the relationship lasted three years.

She was married to actor Nicolas Trevijano from 1995 to 2000. In the same year, 2000, Bel married the singer Fábio Mondego, lead singer of the band Os Impossíveis, she has a son, Davi, born in 2005, the result of the relationship; Davi has autism and tuberous sclerosis. They separated in 2008, after eight years of union.

Since 2009, Bel dates with Pedro Delamare, owner of the Gula Gula restaurant chain.

Filmography

Television

Films

References

External links

1970 births
Living people
Actresses from Rio de Janeiro (city)
Brazilian people of Polish descent
Brazilian people of Jewish descent
Brazilian television actresses
Brazilian telenovela actresses
Brazilian film actresses
Brazilian stage actresses